This is a list of current and former varsity ice hockey programs that played under NCAA guidelines and/or predated the NCAA's foundation.

History
When the NCAA began overseeing college ice hockey in 1947, the statistical record keeping for players wasn't a priority. Teams were allowed to be entirely responsible for their own players' stats and, as a result, some programs have good existing records while others do not. Goaltender stats are particularly absent in many programs with several categories either missing or incomplete into the 1980s. As the importance of college hockey grew, with an increasing number of players having a chance at a professional career, stats became indispensable for players as a way of attracting attention from scouts.

Pre-NCAA records
Few schools track records prior to 1947. Most individual records from this period are missing and many of the statistics that exist cannot be verified. Of the existing marks, the pre-NCAA stats should be divided into three separate eras: pre-1920, 1920-1932 and 1932-1947. In the first era, teams played 7-on-7 for (typically) 40 minutes and many teams used the same lineup throughout the match. College hockey shifted to the modern 6-on-6 style shortly after World War I with the final recorded 7-on-7 match being played in 1921 (Harvard was the last holdout). About the same time, teams began playing three 15-minute periods rather than two 20-minute halves. The periods were soon expanded to 20-minutes for most contests throughout the 1920s until 60-minute games became the standard before the 1930s. 1932 was the first year that assists were officially recorded as a statistic. Initially only the primary assist was tracked, however, college teams soon began following the NHL model and the secondary assist was eventually recorded as well.

The records that follow are unofficial and few are complete.

Pre-1920

Career

Season

Game

NCAA Division I men's records

The NCAA does not recognize any statistical achievements prior to 1947–48. Beginning that year and ending in 1963–64, all varsity programs played at the same level. Despite the NCAA creating the University- and College-tiers in the mid-50's there was only one national tournament and no official separation for college hockey. While there were informal tiers of play (the WCHA being regarded superior to the MIAC for instance), the delineation of college ice hockey was not formally introduced until ECAC 2 was formed and all lower-tier programs were placed in the College Division. Because of this, all scoring done prior to 1964 was done at the equivalent of the Division I level. The NCAA created numerical divisions in 1973 and all university-division records were grandfathered into D-I.

Individual Records
Records reflect only those statistics that are available. Current at of June 1, 2022.

Career

* Minimum 30 games played.

Season

* Minimum 1/3 of team minutes played.

Game

† Seven players have scored 3 short handed goals in 1 game. Only the most recent is listed.

NCAA Division I men's leaders by team
A list of career leaders for current NCAA Division I programs. Only includes statistics recorded while the program was playing at the Division I level.
As of June 1, 2022.

* Minimum 30 games

References

Ice Hockey
NCAA Division I ice hockey
Statistics